Michael E. Stencel is the current Adjutant General of the Oregon National Guard. As a Major General, he commands over 8,100 soldiers and airmen. He is a command pilot with over 1,900 hours flying training and fighter aircraft.

Oregon National Guard Adjutant General

Governor Kate Brown appointed Brigadier General Stencel to the position of Adjutant General of the Oregon National Guard, Oregon's top military leader, in September 2015.  In November of that year, he was promoted to Major General. As Adjutant General, his command includes over 6,100 Army and 2,200 Air National Guard service members, is responsible for the administration of the Oregon National Guard, the Oregon State Defense Force, and the Office of Oregon Emergency Management and serves as the governor's homeland security adviser. He also collaborates with the state's governor and legislature to develop and coordinate programs, plans and policies of the Oregon National Guard.

In October 2015, Stencel went to Vietnam as part of the U.S. Agency for International Development's Overseas Humanitarian Disaster Assistance and Civic Action Program in the Quang Nam Province of Vietnam.  Serving as the senior U.S. representative, he cut a ribbon at the grand opening of an intermediate school cooperatively built by the U.S. and Vietnam, which will also be a natural disaster shelter.

Education

Civilian education

Stencel earned two bachelor's degrees, both at the University of Washington: a Bachelor of Science in civil engineering in 1983, and a Bachelor of Arts in political science in 1991.  He earned a Master of Business Administration in 1995 at Portland State University.

Military education

Stencel earned his pilot's wings after training at Columbus Air Force Base in Mississippi from December 1984 to November 1985. In 1987, he trained at the Squadron Officer School at Maxwell Air Force Base, and in 1993, he completed the aircraft mishap investigation course at Kirtland Air Force Base.  In 2001, Stencel completed the air base combat engineering course at Wright-Patterson Air Force Base.  

Stencel's command background education included training at Air Command & Staff College at Maxwell Air Force Base in 2000; United States Northern Command, Joint Task Force Commander Training Course and Dual Status Commander Training Qualification Program at Peterson Air Force Base in 2012–2013.

Rating and awards

Stencel holds a command pilot rating and has over 1,900 flight hours in military aircraft.  He has flown the Cessna T-37 Tweet, Northrop T-38 Talon, the McDonnell Douglas F-4 Phantom II, and McDonnell Douglas F-15 Eagle models A, B, C, and D.

References

Sources
 
 
 

Year of birth missing (living people)
Living people
University of Washington College of Arts and Sciences alumni
University of Washington College of Engineering alumni
Portland State University alumni
Oregon National Guard personnel
Adjutants general of the National Guard of the United States